The 1952–53 Scottish League Cup was the seventh season of Scotland's second football knockout competition. The competition was won Dundee for a second successive season, who defeated Kilmarnock in the Final.

First round

Group 1

Group 2

Group 3

Group 4

Group 5

Group 6

Group 7

Group 8

Quarter-finals

First leg

Second leg

Semi-finals

Final

References

General

Specific

Scottish League Cup seasons
League Cup